Anastasiia Moskalenko (born 16 August 2000) is a Ukrainian Paralympic athlete competing in F32-classification club throw and shot put events. She won the gold medal with a new world record of 7.61 metres in the women's shot put F32 event at the 2020 Summer Paralympics held in Tokyo, Japan. She also won the silver medal in the women's club throw F32 event. She also set a new personal best in this event of 24.73 metres.

She is also a gold medalist at the World Para Athletics Championships and a four-time medalist, including three golds, at the World Para Athletics European Championships.

References

External links 
 

Living people
2000 births
Place of birth missing (living people)
Female club throwers
Ukrainian club throwers
Ukrainian female shot putters
Medalists at the World Para Athletics European Championships
Medalists at the World Para Athletics Championships
Paralympic athletes of Ukraine
Athletes (track and field) at the 2020 Summer Paralympics
Medalists at the 2020 Summer Paralympics
Paralympic gold medalists for Ukraine
Paralympic silver medalists for Ukraine
Paralympic medalists in athletics (track and field)
Sportspeople from Dnipro
21st-century Ukrainian women